Kimiko Date was the defending champion but lost in the final 7–6, 7–5 against Amy Frazier.

Seeds
A champion seed is indicated in bold text while text in italics indicates the round in which that seed was eliminated.

  Kimiko Date (final)
  Amy Frazier (champion)
  Marianne Werdel-Witmeyer (second round)
  Mana Endo (second round)
  Kyoko Nagatsuka (quarterfinals)
  Yone Kamio (quarterfinals)
  Patty Fendick (quarterfinals)
  Nana Miyagi (semifinals)

Draw

External links
 1995 Japan Open Tennis Championships Draw

Singles